Elizabeth Lloyd Holman (née Holzman; May 23, 1904 – June 18, 1971) was an American socialite, actress, singer, and activist.

Early life
Elizabeth Lloyd Holzman was born May 23, 1904, in Cincinnati, Ohio, the daughter of a lawyer and stockbroker Alfred Holzman and his wife Rachel Florence Workum Holzman. Her family was Jewish, but she was not raised religiously. Their other children were daughter Marion H. Holzman and son Alfred Paul Holzman.

In 1904, the wealthy family grew destitute after Holman's uncle Ross Holzman embezzled nearly $1 million of their stock brokerage business. Alfred changed the family name from Holzman to Holman around World War I due to anti-German sentiment. Libby graduated from Hughes High School on June 11, 1920, at the age of 16. She graduated from the University of Cincinnati on June 16, 1923, with a Bachelor of Arts degree. Holman later subtracted two years from her age, insisting she was born in 1906, the year she gave the Social Security Administration as the year of her birth.

Theatrical career
Holman left her hometown in the fall of 1924 to pursue acting in New York City. She first lived at an all-women's dormitory at a YWCA and took classes at Columbia University. She began working for female pimp Polly Adler in the winter when her savings ran low. Adler arranged her shift schedule to accommodate her classes. She later remembered of Holman: "Every afternoon she would arrive after her classes, carrying her schoolbooks, wearing the short skirts, oxfords and beret that were the thing among coeds, and settle down to work..." She was "pleasant, smiling, and matter-of-fact about her method of earning a living, and no matter what amount of money was offered her after her deadline of eleven o'clock [the curfew of the YWCA], her answer was always 'No.'"

Her first theater job in New York was in the road company of The Fool. Channing Pollock, the writer of The Fool, recognized Holman's talents immediately and advised her to pursue a theatrical career. She followed Pollock's advice and soon became a star. Producer Leonard Sillman relates, in his autobiography Here Lies Leonard Sillman: Straightened Out at Last, that he "liked the name Libby much better than her legal one and under my gentle prodding, 24 hours a day, she changed it.” An early stage colleague who became a longtime close friend was future film star Clifton Webb, then a dancer. He gave her the nickname, "The Statue of Libby".

Her Broadway debut was in the play The Sapphire Ring in 1925 at the Selwyn Theatre, which closed after 13 performances. She was billed as Elizabeth Holman. Her big break came while she was appearing with Clifton Webb and Fred Allen in the 1929 Broadway revue The Little Show, in which she first sang the blues number "Moanin' Low"  by Ralph Rainger, which earned her a dozen curtain calls on opening night, drew raves from the critics and became her signature song. Also in that show, she sang the Kay Swift and Paul James song, "Can't We Be Friends?". She became known as the “premier torch singer” of Broadway.

The following year, Holman introduced the Howard Dietz and Arthur Schwartz standard "Something to Remember You By" in the show Three's a Crowd, which also starred Allen and Webb. Other Broadway appearances included The Garrick Gaieties (1925), Merry-Go-Round (1927), Rainbow (1928), Ned Wayburn's Gambols (1929), Revenge with Music (1934), You Never Know (1938, score by Cole Porter), during which production she had a strong rivalry with the Mexican actress Lupe Vélez; and her self-produced one-woman revue Blues, Ballads and Sin-Songs (1954).

One of Holman's signature looks was the strapless dress, which she has been credited with having invented, or at least being one of its first high-profile wearers.

Personal life
In the industry, press, and among friends, Holman was known for her bold personality. She was the frequent subject of contemporary gossip columns, and became known in the press as "the dark purple menace." Memories of friends, acquaintances, and colleagues detail the stage manner and individuality she was known for. For example, friend and colleague Howard Dietz, who described her as "the swarthy, sloe-eyed houri," recalled: 

Additionally, Leonard Sillman remembered of her: 

Libby Holman had a variety of relationships with both men and women during her lifetime, including Jeanne Eagels, Tallulah Bankhead, Josephine Baker, and, later in her life, writer Jane Bowles. Although friends observed her to be a "ball breaker" with men, she was tender and intimate in her same-sex relationships. Her most prominent relationship was with DuPont heiress Louisa d'Andelot Carpenter. The couple's relationship would last until Holman's death in 1971; during Libby's Broadway career in the early 20s, they would go out to parties and jaunts in Harlem dressed identically in men's suits in bowler hats, joined by other lesbian and bisexual contemporaries such as Tallulah Bankhead, Beatrice Lillie, Joan Crawford, and Marilyn Miller. Carpenter was to play a significant part throughout Holman's lifetime. They raised their children and lived together and were openly accepted by their theater companions. She scandalized some by dating much younger men, such as American actor Montgomery Clift, whom she mentored.

Holman took an interest in one fan, Zachary Smith Reynolds, a hobbyist aviator and heir to the R.J. Reynolds tobacco company 7 years her junior . He was known to friends and family as just "Smith." They met in Baltimore, Maryland in April 1930 after he saw her perform in The Little Show. He asked his friend Dwight Deere Wiman, the producer of the show, to introduce him to her. He pursued her around the world in his plane, and became known as "Smitty, the traveling bear" in Holman's friend group, referencing his pet-like devotion to following her around the world. Although Holman's friends didn't like Reynolds, finding him moody and difficult to talk to, they tolerated his presence, as he paid for the entourage's visits to New York speakeasies and nightclubs. The couple argued often and would occasionally descend into fights in front of Holman's circle of friends. Reynolds threatened suicide to Holman on multiple occasions; In a letter to her, written while on an aviation journey, he once wrote: "Darling Angel. I would gladly come home if you were not going on with the show. I'll gladly give up this trip or anything I have to devote all my time to you, if you would do the same for me. If I get to the point where I simply cannot stand it without you for another minute, well, there's the old Mauser with a few cartridges in it. I guess I've had my inning. It's time another team went to bat."

Despite the tempestuous nature of their relationship, Holman and Reynolds married on November 29, 1931, in the parlor of the Justice of the Peace's house in Monroe, Michigan. Reynolds wanted Holman to abandon her acting career. She took a one-year leave of absence to stay at the Reynolds family estate in Winston-Salem, North Carolina.

Death of Zachary Smith Reynolds

On the night of July 5, 1932 at Reynolda, Reynolds and Holman threw a 21st birthday party for Smith's childhood friend Charles Gideon Hill Jr. After the party attendees had left, with only Reynolds's best friend and secretary Albert "Ab" Bailey Walker, and Holman's friend, actress Blanche Yurka, remaining in the house, Reynolds died of a gunshot wound to the head in the morning of July 6. As many witnesses had been drunk, statements about the event were conflicting and muddled. Holman said she was unable to remember much of the night or the following day; the numerous testimonies given by Walker in the inquest contradicted each other. Authorities ruled the shooting a suicide, but a coroner's inquiry ruled it murder.

The death was front-page news, and the local sheriff leaked details to the press, inciting more speculation. Carpenter paid Holman's $25,000 bail at the Rockingham County Courthouse in Wentworth, North Carolina. Holman wore a heavy veil and dark dress, and bystanders and reporters thought she was black or of mixed race—a common misconception because of her olive skin tone. Holman left for Cincinnati to seek the help of her father, who was a lawyer. Fearing further scandal, the Reynolds family contacted the local authorities and had the charges dropped. On January 10, 1933, Holman gave birth to Christopher Smith "Topper" Reynolds.

The trauma of Reynolds' death would follow Holman until the end of her life. She died by suicide June 18, 1971. Friend and former lover Ned Rorem recorded in his diary on June 22:

That Holman was unable to remember what happened is repeated by biographer Jon Bradshaw's work. Bradshaw relates from interviews with still-living close friends that Holman called them on the telephone in a panic: "She told Louisa [Carpenter] that the Reynolds family were being horrible to her, almost as though they suspected that she had something to do with Smith's demise. But unfortunately Libby could not remember anything. 'I was so drunk last night,' she said, 'I don't know whether I shot him or not.'"

Journalist Milt Machlin investigated the death of Reynolds and argued that he committed suicide. In his account Holman was a victim of the anti-Semitism of local authorities. The district attorney involved with the case later told Machlin that she was innocent, and he thought that if the case had gone to trial there might have been violence similar to the Leo Frank case.

The 1933 film Sing, Sinner, Sing was loosely based on the allegations surrounding Reynolds' death, as were the films Reckless and Written on the Wind.

Later years
In March 1939, Holman married Ralph (pronounced "Rafe") Holmes, a film and stage actor. She had dated his older brother Phillips Holmes. In 1940, both brothers, who were half-Canadian, joined the Royal Canadian Air Force. Phillips Holmes was killed in a collision of two military aircraft on August 12, 1942. When Ralph Holmes returned home in August 1945, the marriage soured and they separated. On November 15, 1945, Ralph Holmes was found dead in his Manhattan apartment from a barbiturate overdose at age 29.

During World War II, she tried to organize shows for servicemen with her friend, African-American musician Josh White, but they were turned down on the grounds that "we don't book mixed company."

Holman adopted two sons, Timmy (born October 18, 1945), and Tony (born May 19, 1947). Her biological son Christopher ("Topper") died on August 7, 1950, after falling while mountain climbing. She had given him permission to go mountain climbing with a friend on Mount Whitney, the highest peak in California, but was unaware that the boys were ill-prepared for the adventure. Both died. Those close to Holman claim she never forgave herself.

After the death of her son Christopher, Holman (who had some money from her marriage to Reynolds) created the Christopher Reynolds Foundation to support equality, international disarmament, and the resolution of environmental problems. Over time the foundation narrowed its scope to more specific causes, such as relations between Cuba and the U.S. She contributed to the defense of Benjamin Spock, the pediatrician and writer arrested for taking part in antiwar demonstrations.

In the 1950s, Holman worked with her accompanist, Gerald Cook, on researching and rearranging what they called earth music. It was primarily blues and spirituals that were linked to the African American community. She was involved in the Civil rights movement and became a close friend and associate of Martin Luther King Jr. Through her foundation she provided funds for King's trip to India with his wife Coretta Scott King to meet followers of Mahatma Gandhi, whom he referred to as "the guiding light of our technique of nonviolent social change".

On December 27, 1960, she married artist and fellow activist Louis Schanker. She continued to perform and make records.

Death and legacy

Holman reportedly suffered from depression following the deaths of John F. Kennedy and Martin Luther King Jr., the presidential election loss by Eugene McCarthy, the deaths of young men in the Vietnam War, the death of her son, and the illness of her friend Jane Bowles. Friends said she lost her vitality after the death of Montgomery Clift in 1966. The deaths of multiple people close to her, combined with the Vietnam War and the turbulent political situation took a toll on her mental health.

On June 18, 1971, Holman was found nearly dead in the front seat of her Rolls-Royce. She was taken to the hospital where she died hours later. Her death was ruled a suicide due to carbon monoxide poisoning. In view of her bouts with depression and reported past suicide attempts, none of Holman's friends or relatives was surprised by her death. She was cremated and her ashes scattered at Treetops.

In 2001, a successful effort was made by citizens to save Treetops, her Connecticut estate, from development. It straddles the border of Stamford and Greenwich. As a result, the pristine grounds were preserved. Treetops is part of the Mianus River State Park, overseen by the Connecticut Department of Environmental Protection. Treetops is south of the Mianus River Park. The mansion is privately owned. In 2006, Louis Schanker's art studio on a hill overlooking the property became the home of the Treetops Chamber Music Society.

Filmography
 Dreams That Money Can Buy (1947)

Musical theater credits
 The Sapphire Ring - Selwyn Theatre (1925)
 The Garrick Gaieties - Garrick Theatre (1925)
 Greenwich Village Follies - Shubert Theatre (1926)
 Merry-Go-Round - Klaw Theatre (1927)
 Rainbow - Gallo Theatre (1928)
 Ned Wayburn's Gambols - Knickerbocker Theatre (1929)
 The Little Show - Music Box Theatre (1929)
 Three's a Crowd - Selwyn Theatre (1930)
 Revenge with Music- New Amsterdam Theatre (1934)
 You Never Know - Winter Garden Theatre (1938)
 Blues, Ballads, and Sin Songs (1954)

Hit records

In pop culture
 The 1933 film Sing, Sinner, Sing was loosely based on the allegations surrounding Reynolds' death, as were the films Reckless and Written on the Wind.
 The song "Broken Bracelets" by Marc Almond is about Holman, referencing her suicide, "Moanin' Low," and the violence in her relationship with Reynolds. Almond also featured Holman in a retrospective of his favorite torch singers, calling her "perhaps the first bona fide torch singer."

References

External links
 Biography of Libby Holman by Kenneth Lisenbee 
 Hughes High School history
 Books of the Times: A Torch-Song Life
 
 
 Louis Schanker and Libby Holman: The Hamptons Connection
 Libby Holman collection at Howard Gotlieb Archival Research Center, Boston University

1904 births
1971 suicides
20th-century American actresses
20th-century American singers
20th-century American women singers
Actresses from Cincinnati
Female suicides
American civil rights activists
American women pop singers
American film actresses
American musical theatre actresses
American socialites
American stage actresses
Bisexual actresses
Bisexual musicians
Bisexual women
Connecticut Democrats
Jewish American actresses
Jewish women singers
Ohio Democrats
LGBT Jews
LGBT people from Ohio
American LGBT singers
Musicians from Cincinnati
Reynolds family
Suicides by carbon monoxide poisoning
Suicides in Connecticut
Torch singers
Traditional pop music singers
University of Cincinnati alumni
Women civil rights activists
20th-century American LGBT people
20th-century American Jews
American bisexual actors
Brunswick Records artists
Victor Records artists